The Tsirku River  is a glacier-fed stream in Southeast Alaska near the town of Haines in the U.S. state of Alaska. The river's source is found at the Tsirku Glacier, a large, sprawling ice mass at the border of Alaska and the Canadian province of British Columbia. While many of the feeding glaciers are primarily in British Columbia, the river course lies entirely in Alaska.

After the Klehini River, the Tsirku River is the second largest tributary of the Chilkat River.

See also
List of rivers of Alaska

References

Rivers of Alaska
Rivers of Haines Borough, Alaska